Wish Dragon is a 2021 computer-animated fantasy comedy film written and directed by Chris Appelhans (in his feature directorial debut) and produced by Sony Pictures Animation and Tencent Pictures. The film stars Jimmy Wong, John Cho, Constance Wu, Natasha Liu Bordizzo, Jimmy O. Yang, Aaron Yoo, Will Yun Lee, and Ronny Chieng. Jackie Chan produced the film and voiced Cho's role in the Chinese Mandarin version.

Wish Dragon was released theatrically in China on January 15, 2021 and on Netflix internationally on June 11, 2021, and it received mixed reviews from critics.

Plot

Din is a working-class college student in Shanghai who dreams of reuniting with his childhood friend Li Na, who moved away ten years ago from their neighborhood with her father, Mr. Wang, and now lives a lavish life. One day, Din is given a teapot by an elderly man, from which emerges Long, a wish dragon. Long informs Din he will grant three wishes to his master, i.e. whoever holds the teapot. Din will be Long's tenth and final master and will free Long from his servitude, allowing him to enter the Spirit world. Subsequently, Din is chased by a trio of goons led by a man named Pockets, sent by Mr. Wang to recover the teapot in hopes of saving his failing business. Din uses his first wish to fight the goons and escape.

The next day, Din and Long arrive at Li Na's birthday party. Din makes his second wish—to temporarily appear as a wealthy princeling for one day, hoping Li Na will notice him and rekindle their friendship. Li Na is disappointed when she learns her father will not be attending her birthday party. Din, sticking to his disguise as 'Dan', comforts her and they are asked by Mr. Wang (via a video call) to share a meal together. Long warns Din that Li Na will leave him as soon as she finds out his identity, because of their different socioeconomic status.

During the date, Din asks Long for advice on how to act accordingly to his new status, but ends up upsetting Li Na in the process. They both end up in Din's neighborhood after the goons pursue Din again. Din reveals himself to Li Na, and they spend the rest of the day in the neighborhood reliving their childhood pastimes. However, Li Na finally retreats claiming that she has responsibilities and expectations she needs to meet, hurting Din's feelings. Later that night, Din angrily asks Long to make him rich in a last-ditch effort to be respected. Long reveals to Din that in life he was a wealthy and powerful lord whose reign ended in loneliness and tragedy and was punished by the gods for his selfishness by becoming a wish dragon. Long's servitude as a wish dragon is meant to make him appreciate the meaning of life, something he has failed to accomplish with all of his previous masters.

After tracking down Din, Pockets betrays Mr. Wang by taking the teapot for himself and asks the wish dragon for his first wish to turn everything he touches to gold. He drops Mr. Wang from a large scaffolding, mortally wounding him in front of Li Na. Din chases the goons, and eventually ends up fighting Pockets on Long's back. Pockets corners Din and prepares to hit him with his golden hand, but Long puts himself in the way, causing both him and Pockets (who accidentally touched himself) to turn into gold statues. Din is unable to stop Long's statue from sinking to the bottom of a river, while Pockets shatters to pieces against the ground.

Long finds his human self at the entrance to the Spirit world. Despite being tempted to go through the gates, he pleads with the guardian of the gate to return to Din because he has not used his third wish. The guardian agrees, on one condition. Din uses his last wish to heal Mr. Wang, and Long disappears.

Sometime later, Mr. Wang starts a restaurant featuring Din's mother's cooking, with both Din and Li Na helping. Din finds a teapot like the one Long resided in and releases him. Long tells Din the sole condition for his return to Earth was to stay and serve ten more masters. After saying goodbye to Long, Din places the teapot on a carriage driven by the elderly man from the beginning, who is actually the guardian of the gate to the Spirit world.

Voice cast
Jimmy Wong as Din Song, a working-class college student who dreams to reunite with his childhood friend Li Na
Ian Chen as young Din
John Cho as Long, a cynical but all-powerful dragon capable of granting wishes
Max Charles as young Long
Constance Wu as Mrs. Song, Din's strict but loving mother
Natasha Liu Bordizzo as Li Na Wang, Din's childhood friend, who moved with her father years ago from the neighborhood where she lived and now lives a lavish life
Alyssa Abiera as young Li Na
Jimmy O. Yang as Short Goon, one of Pockets' goons; and a security guard
Aaron Yoo as Pockets, a henchman hired by Wang to retrieve the teapot that Din has
Will Yun Lee as Mr. Wang, Li Na's absent but caring father, whose company business is failing
Ronny Chieng as Pipa God, the guardian of the gate to the Spirit world

Nico Santos and Bobby Lee voice, respectively: Buckley, Mr. Wang's assistant; and Diao (credited as "Tall Goon"), one of Pockets' goons. The film's director Chris Appelhans voices a hot towel waiter and a Nomani retailer. Niu Junfeng and Jackie Chan voice Din and Long, respectively, in the film's Mandarin dub.

Production
Wish Dragon is the first Sony Pictures Animation film to be produced by Base Animation, a new animation studio that is part of the VFX firm Base FX and also the first to feature visual effects and animation provided by Industrial Light & Magic. The goal of the film and the Base Animation studio is to "make world class animation in China for China... and the world". Writer and director Chris Appelhans "wanted the film made in China, with a strong Mainland China creative team, an international cast of talent, and a focus on the hopes and dreams of contemporary China." The film is Appelhans' directorial debut. The film was officially completed on January 8, 2020.

Music
"Endless Sky" by Weilim Lin, Kenton Chen and Katherine Ho
"Free Smiles" by Tia Ray and Far East Movement
"Bu Liao Qing (Love Without End)" by Carrie Koo Mei

Release 
Wish Dragon was originally scheduled to be released on July 26, 2019, but at the Annecy International Animated Film Festival it was confirmed that it was delayed to 2020. In October, it was confirmed by Kipo and the Age of Wonderbeasts' creator Radford Sechrist (who served as head of story on the film) that the film would instead be released in 2021. The film was released in China on January 15, 2021.

The film was released on Netflix on June 11, 2021, as part of its summer slate.

Reception
On review aggregator Rotten Tomatoes, the film holds an approval rating of 68% based on 25 reviews with an average rating of 6.10/10. The site's critical consensus reads, "Although its juvenile humor may test some viewers' patience, Wish Dragon is a colorful and quirky romp that will warm audience's hearts." On Metacritic, the film has a weighted average score of 59 out of 100 based on reviews from 6 critics, indicating "mixed or average reviews".

Awards and nominations

Notes

References

External links

2021 comedy films
2021 computer-animated films
2021 directorial debut films
2020s children's animated films
2020s fantasy comedy films
American computer-animated films
American children's animated comedy films
American children's animated fantasy films
Chinese computer-animated films
Chinese children's films
English-language Chinese films
Chinese-language films
Animated films about dragons
Films about wish fulfillment
Films produced by Aron Warner
Sony Pictures Animation films
Columbia Pictures animated films
Columbia Pictures films
Tencent Pictures films
2020s English-language films
2020s American films
English-language Netflix original films